Philip H. Iselin (September 1, 1902 – December 28, 1976) was a New York City women's apparel manufacturer who was a shareholder and President of the New York Jets football team and Chairman of Monmouth Park Racetrack in Oceanport, New Jersey. He was a member of the original Board of Directors that bought the New York Titans in 1963 and renamed the franchise the Jets. In 1969, he succeeded Sonny Werblin as President of the Jets.

A member of The Jockey Club, Iselin and Amory L. Haskell headed a group of investors who founded the Monmouth Park Jockey Club in 1944 to build a new Thoroughbred horse racing facility in Oceanport, New Jersey. The track opened in 1946 and Iselin served as treasurer of the Monmouth Park Jockey Club until 1968 when he was appointed President.

While at work in the New York Jets Manhattan offices, Iselin died after suffering his second heart attack in three months.

Son James "Jimmy" Iselin became a racehorse trainer.

References

Further reading
December 29, 1976 Boca Raton News article titled "Phil Iselin leaves legacy of love"
January 1, 1977 St. Petersburg Times article titled "Sport world mourns Iselin"

1902 births
1976 deaths
New York Jets owners
New York Jets executives
National Football League team presidents
American textile industry businesspeople
Monmouth Park Racetrack
American horse racing industry executives
Businesspeople from New York (state)
Jewish American sportspeople
People from Port Washington, New York
20th-century American businesspeople
20th-century American Jews